Malettinins are polyketide-derived, antimicrobials made by Hypoxylon.

External links
Malettinins B-D: new polyketide metabolites from an unidentified fungal colonist of Hypoxylon Stromata (NRRL 29110).

Antimicrobials